Poor Meadow Brook is a  stream within the Taunton River Watershed in southeastern Massachusetts. The stream runs from a wetland near County Street (the eastern crossing of Route 14) in Hanson to the confluence with the Satucket River in East Bridgewater.

References

External links
Environmental Protection Agency

Rivers of Plymouth County, Massachusetts
Taunton River watershed
Rivers of Massachusetts